Jean Janssens was a Belgian cyclist. He won the bronze medal in the Team road race in the 1920 Summer Olympics.

References

Year of birth missing
Year of death missing
Belgian male cyclists
Olympic cyclists of Belgium
Olympic bronze medalists for Belgium
Cyclists at the 1920 Summer Olympics
Olympic medalists in cycling
Medalists at the 1920 Summer Olympics
Place of birth missing
20th-century Belgian people